Sjøgata is a historic and picturesque area running along the mouth of the river Vefsna in the town of Mosjøen which is located in Vefsn Municipality.  It lies in the traditional district of Helgeland in Nordland county, Norway. Sjøgata, with the largest concentration of listed wooden buildings in northern Norway, is a popular tourist site. Sjøgata is an area of piers, storehouses, boathouses, a number of galleries and several restaurants, together with the Vefsn museum and Kulturverkstedet, a culture workshop with exhibitions. Sjøgata has been awarded the St. Olav Rose, the Norwegian Heritage Seal of Quality. Fru Haugans Hotel, located on the end of Sjøgata, is the oldest hotel in North Norway dating back to a former trading post established in 1794.

References

External links
"Olavrosa.no"
"Visit Nordland.no"
"Sjogata.no"
Helgeland Museum
Kulturverkstedet i Sjøgata
Fru Haugans Hotel

Geography of Nordland
Vefsn
Tourist attractions in Nordland